The Epic Archive, Vol. 3 (1984–1992) is a compilation album by American rock band Cheap Trick, which was released digitally by Epic in 2015. In 2019, the compilation was released by Real Gone Music on CD and vinyl, the latter format being a limited edition release for Record Store Day.

The compilation has sixteen tracks spanning from 1984 to 1992, including soundtrack songs, single versions and alternate versions/mixes of tracks from Standing on the Edge (1985), The Doctor (1986), Lap of Luxury (1988) and Busted (1990). The liner notes of the 2019 Real Gone Music release include quotes on the tracks from drummer Bun E. Carlos, guitarist Rick Nielsen and singer Robin Zander, as well as photographs of the band taken by Robert Alford.

Track listing

Charts

References

Cheap Trick compilation albums
2015 compilation albums
Epic Records compilation albums